Cabinet Office may refer to:
 Cabinet Office of the United Kingdom
Cabinet Office (Spain)
 Cabinet Office (Japan)
 Cabinet Office (Ontario)
 Cabinet Office (Sri Lanka)

See also
Cabinet department
Department of the Prime Minister and Cabinet (disambiguation)
Prime Minister's Office (disambiguation)